Giovanni Mpetshi Perricard (born 8 July 2003) is a French tennis player.

Mpetshi Perricard has a career high ATP singles ranking of 357 achieved on 7 November 2022. He also has a career high ATP doubles ranking of 613 achieved on 25 July 2022.

Mpetshi Perricard won the 2021 French Open boys' doubles title.

Junior Grand Slam titles

Doubles: 1 (1 title)

ATP Challenger and ITF Futures finals

Singles: 1 (1–2)

Doubles: 1 (1–0)

References

External links
 
 

2003 births
Living people
French male tennis players
Grand Slam (tennis) champions in boys' doubles
French Open junior champions
Tennis players from Lyon